Huang Minhao (born 21 August 1992) is a Chinese weightlifter competing in the 62 kg category until 2018 and 67 kg starting in 2018 after the International Weightlifting Federation reorganized the categories.

Career

He participated at the 2018 World Weightlifting Championships and won a silver medal in the 67 kg division.

Major results

References

External links

1992 births
Living people
Chinese male weightlifters
World Weightlifting Championships medalists
21st-century Chinese people